Charles Mark Anthony "Mat" Davidson (2 May 1869 – 9 January 1949) was an Australian politician.

Early life
Davidson was born in Sydney to James Davidson, a tailor from Edinburgh, and his wife Margaret. Davidson left school at 12 to begin an apprenticeship as a tailor, which he did not complete. After a short period working on a coastal vessel trading with the Pacific islands Davidson worked as a bushworker, shearer and tank sinker in the Monaro. He worked as miner from about 1888 to 1896 in Victoria, Broken Hill and Cobar. He lost an eye in a mining accident and became a tobacconist and barber in Cobar. He married Gertrude Mary Snape in July 1901 and they had three daughters and one son. Davidson was a foundation member of the Australian Workers' Union and helped to form a local branch of the Amalgamated Miners' Association in Cobar. He was active in local politics, being a member of the Political Labor League, the District Hospital Board, the racing club, the School of Arts and the Eight-Hour Day Sports committees. He also served as an alderman on the Cobar Municipal Council from 1913 to 1918, where he worked to promote railway extension.

Parliamentary career
In 1918 Davidson was elected as a Labor Party member for Cobar in the New South Wales Legislative Assembly. With the introduction of proportional representation in 1920, the seat of Cobar was absorbed into Sturt and he was elected as one of its members. He served as Labor whip in the state parliament from 1923 to 1930. With the abolition of proportional representation in 1927, he was elected as the member for Murray. In 1930, following another redistribution, he was again elected as the member for Cobar. From November 1930 to May 1932 Davidson served as Secretary for Public Works in the Third Lang Ministry. During the 30 years he spent in state parliament his electorates always included Cobar. He died in office in the Sydney suburb of Little Bay, New South Wales.

Notes

 

Members of the New South Wales Legislative Assembly
1869 births
1949 deaths
Australian Labor Party members of the Parliament of New South Wales